The Year of the Underdogz is a collaborative studio album by rappers Young Noble & Gage Gully. It was released on May 7, 2013 by A.G.E/Empire Distribution.

Track listing

References

External links 
 OutlawzMedia.net Official Website
 
 
 
 
 
 
 
 
 
 

2013 albums
Young Noble albums
Collaborative albums
Empire Distribution albums